Robert Byron Kugler (born October 10, 1950) is a senior United States district judge of the United States District Court for the District of New Jersey and also serving as a Judge on the United States Foreign Intelligence Surveillance Court.

Education and career

Born in Camden, New Jersey, Kugler attended and graduated from The Peddie School in 1968 and received a Bachelor of Arts degree from Syracuse University in 1975 and a Juris Doctor from Rutgers School of Law–Camden in Camden in 1978. He was a law clerk for Judge John F. Gerry of the United States District Court for the District of New Jersey from 1978 to 1979. He was an Assistant Prosecutor, Camden County Prosecutor's Office, New Jersey from 1979 to 1981. He was a Deputy attorney general of Division of Criminal Justice, New Jersey Department of Law and Public Safety from 1981 to 1982. He was in private practice in New Jersey from 1982 to 1992.

District court service

Kugler was a United States magistrate judge of the United States District Court for the District of New Jersey from 1992 to 2002. He was nominated by President George W. Bush on August 1, 2002, to a seat on the District Court vacated by Joseph E. Irenas. He was confirmed by the United States Senate on November 14, 2002, and received his commission on December 4, 2002. On May 19, 2017 he was appointed to be a judge of the United States Foreign Intelligence Surveillance Court by John Roberts. He assumed senior status on November 2, 2018.

Family

Kugler is the son of George F. Kugler, Jr., who served as New Jersey Attorney General from 1970 to 1974. His brother Pete Kugler played eight seasons in the National Football League for the San Francisco 49ers and two seasons in the United States Football League for the Philadelphia/Baltimore Stars.

References

Sources

1950 births
Living people
Judges of the United States District Court for the District of New Jersey
Judges of the United States Foreign Intelligence Surveillance Court
New Jersey lawyers
People from Camden, New Jersey
Rutgers School of Law–Camden alumni
Syracuse University alumni
United States district court judges appointed by George W. Bush
United States magistrate judges
20th-century American lawyers
21st-century American judges